James Phillip Bird (born January 14, 1989) is a Welsh-born American rugby union fly-half.

Early life  
Bird was born in Cardiff, Wales and attended Llanishen Fach Primary School, in the same class as British and Irish Lions Captain, Sam Warburton. He then attended Llanishen High School, and University of Bristol, UK. Upon graduating, Bird took a graduate trainee position with PricewaterhouseCoopers in London.

Career 
Bird moved to New York City in January 2013. Bird was selected for the United States national rugby union team for the inaugural 2016 Americas Rugby Championship. He started in the first game of that championship against Argentina, scoring 15 points on his international debut in a 35–35 draw.

He currently plays club rugby for Old Blue RFC, based in New York City.

External links 
 James Bird's USA Rugby Profile
 The Rugby Paper Article on James Bird

1989 births
Living people
Alumni of the University of Bristol
American rugby union players
Rugby union players from Cardiff
United States international rugby union players
Welsh rugby union players
Rugby union fly-halves